Marco Holzer (born 30 July 1988) is a German professional racing driver. He has competed in sports car competitions such as the 24 Hours of Le Mans, 24 Hours of Daytona, American Le Mans Series and Le Mans Series as a Porsche works driver.

Career

Born in Bobingen, Bavaria, Holzer graduated from karting in 2003, and raced at the Formula BMW ADAC formula championship from 2004 to 2006. In 2006 he competed at the Formula 3 Euro Series, where he scored no points.

In 2008, Holzer switched to sports car racing, finishing fifth at the Porsche Carrera Cup Germany. He signed as Porsche junior works driver, and raced at the 2009 FIA GT Championship for Prospeed and VLN for Manthey, in both cases driving a Porsche 911.

The German became a Porsche works driver in 2010. That year, he resulted vice-champion at the FIA GT3 European Championship for Prospeed with two wins. Also, he raced in several endurance races, such as the VLN for Manthey, the Le Mans Series for Prospeed, Petit Le Mans for Flying Lizard, and the 24 Hours of Le Mans for BMS Scuderia Italia, resulting 3rd in the GT2 class.

Holzer competed partial-time at the 2011 American Le Mans Series for Flying Lizard, the five rounds of the Le Mans Series for Prospeed, and the VLN, where he got an overall win with a hybrid Porsche 911.

In 2012, he raced full-time at the American Le Mans Series for Flying Lizard in the GT class, collecting a best result of 5th at Virginia, and the International GT Open for Manthey, winning three races and resulting vice-champion in the Super GT class. The driver switched to Paul Miller Racing for the 2013 American Le Mans Series, still as Porsche works driver, resulting 13th in the GT class.

Holzer was dropped by Porsche in late 2014.

In 2016, the German joined Abt Sportsline to compete at the ADAC GT Masters with a Bentley Continental GT.

Racing record

Career summary

24 Hours of Le Mans results

Complete WeatherTech SportsCar Championship results
(key) (Races in bold indicate pole position; results in italics indicate fastest lap)

References

External links
 
 
 Marco Holzer at the Porsche website

1988 births
Living people
People from Augsburg (district)
Sportspeople from Swabia (Bavaria)
German racing drivers
Formula BMW ADAC drivers
Formula 3 Euro Series drivers
FIA GT Championship drivers
European Le Mans Series drivers
24 Hours of Daytona drivers
American Le Mans Series drivers
24 Hours of Le Mans drivers
Racing drivers from Bavaria
Rolex Sports Car Series drivers
Porsche Supercup drivers
International GT Open drivers
Blancpain Endurance Series drivers
WeatherTech SportsCar Championship drivers
FIA World Endurance Championship drivers
24 Hours of Spa drivers
Asian Le Mans Series drivers
GT World Challenge America drivers
Porsche Motorsports drivers
ADAC GT Masters drivers
Abt Sportsline drivers
KCMG drivers
Walker Racing drivers
Nürburgring 24 Hours drivers
24H Series drivers